Sarah Reid may refer to:

Sarah Reid (curler) (born 1985), Scottish curler
Sarah Reid (skeleton racer) (born 1987), Canadian skeleton racer

See also
Sarah Read (writer), 2019 winner of the Bram Stoker Award for Best First Novel
Sarah Reed (disambiguation)